Almost Famous: The Sexy Lady EP is an extended play by American rapper Yung Berg. It was released on July 24, 2007 via Epic Records. The only single released from the EP was "Sexy Lady" featuring R&B singer Junior. The album debuted at number 32 on the U.S. Billboard 200, selling about 20,000 copies in its first week.

Track listing

Charts

References 

2007 EPs
Hip hop EPs
Hitmaka albums
Albums produced by Danja (record producer)